Babish Culinary Universe (BCU), formerly Binging with Babish, is a YouTube cooking channel created by American cook and filmmaker Andrew Rea (alias Oliver Babish) that recreates recipes featured in film, television, and video games in the Binging with Babish series, as well as more traditional recipes in the Basics with Babish series. The first video in the series was uploaded on February 10, 2016.

History
The YouTube channel was created by Rea as Binging with Babish on August 21, 2006; his name was inspired by The West Wing character Oliver Babish. Three videos unrelated to Binging with Babish were uploaded to the account, two in 2007 and one in 2010. The first episode of Binging with Babish aired on February 10, 2016, which is about a Parks and Recreation burger cook-off.

Its first video to be widely circulated aired on November 14, 2016, making the "Moistmaker" sandwich from Friends. The channel's growth has been driven by fans promoting its videos on Reddit and other social media platforms. Rea created a Patreon account to earn an income, and after reaching a monthly $10,000 goal, quit his day job to work full-time on Binging with Babish, which is released weekly on Tuesdays. He spent $6,000 on a Sony digital camera, lights and editing software, and does the production, editing and narration for the videos. The cost of each episode, according to Rea, "varies wildly" because of the ever-changing variety of food and ingredients used.

Rea posts recipes for the dishes on his website and on October 3, 2017, he published a cookbook titled Eat What You Watch: A Cookbook for Movie Lovers, containing 40 recipes featured in film. He started the series Basics with Babish on October 12, 2017, teaching preparation of basic recipes, stocking up on and using essential tools and equipment for cooking, as well as a variety of cooking techniques. On October 22, 2019, Rea published his second cookbook titled Binging with Babish: 100 Recipes Recreated from Your Favorite Movies and TV Shows, containing 100 pop-culture recipes from his series.

Shows

Binging with Babish
During each episode, Rea prepares step-by-step instructions on the preparation of film and television-related meals. When Binging with Babish premiered on February 10, 2016, it was filmed at the kitchen of Rea's New York City apartment. Beginning with the "Meat Tornado from Parks & Rec" in August 2020, the show moved to his home studio in Brooklyn, NY, with a voiceover added in post-production.  Each episode contains dry humor and is paced at a fast speed. After creating the dish as it originally appeared, some episodes include Rea's interpretation of the recipe.

Others 
Stump Sohla is the fourth regular show added to the Babish Culinary Universe and features Sohla El-Waylly. The series aired for 10 episodes airing on Saturdays and features Sohla making dishes in a randomly chosen format or theme. Other shows hosted on the channel include Basics with Babish, Being with Babish, Botched by Babish, Pruébalo, Anime with Alvin Zhou, Arcade with Alvin Zhou, and The FundaKendalls.

Episodes

Main series

Spin-offs

Awards and nominations

See also
 List of YouTubers

References

General references

2010s YouTube series
2016 web series debuts
2020s YouTube series
Cooking web series
Food and cooking YouTube channels
Hofstra University alumni
Mass media in New York City
Streamy Award-winning channels, series or shows
YouTube channels launched in 2006
American non-fiction web series